Events from the year 1583 in India.

Events
 July 25 – Cuncolim Revolt
 Muzaffar Shah III escapes from prison and briefly re-establishes the Muzaffarid dynasty of Gujarat before Akbar established the Mughal dynasty
Building of the fort of Allahabad by Emperor Akbar.

Births

Deaths
 Rodolfo Acquaviva, Jesuit missionary at the court of Akbar dies (born 1550)

See also

 Timeline of Indian history

References